Faraoni may refer to:
 Davide Faraoni, Italian footballer
Faraoni (band), Slovenian and Yugoslav rock and pop band
 La donna dei faraoni, Italian film